A Jazz Portrait of Frank Sinatra is a 1959 album by The Oscar Peterson trio, recorded in tribute to singer Frank Sinatra by interpreting songs associated with Sinatra.

Reception

Writing for AllMusic, critic Scott Yanow wrote "This is not one of Oscar Peterson's most essential dates, but it is swinging and enjoyable."

Track listing
 "You Make Me Feel So Young" (Mack Gordon, Josef Myrow) – 2:40
 "Come Dance with Me" (Sammy Cahn, Jimmy Van Heusen) – 2:22
 "Learnin' the Blues" (Dolores Vicki Silvers) – 3:41
 "Witchcraft" (Cy Coleman, Carolyn Leigh) – 3:12
 "(Love Is) The Tender Trap" (Cahn, Van Heusen) – 2:44
 "Saturday Night (Is the Loneliest Night of the Week)" (Cahn, Jule Styne) – 2:57
 "Just in Time" (Betty Comden, Adolph Green, Styne) – 1:53
 "It Happened in Monterey" (Billy Rose, Mabel Wayne) – 2:57
 "I Get a Kick Out of You" (Cole Porter) – 3:03
 "All of Me" (Seymour Simons, Gerald Marks) – 3:25
 "The Birth of the Blues" (Ray Henderson, Buddy DeSylva, Lew Brown) – 2:38
 "How About You?" (Ralph Freed, Burton Lane) – 3:11

Personnel
The Oscar Peterson trio
 Oscar Peterson – piano
 Ray Brown – double bass
 Ed Thigpen – drums

References

1959 albums
Frank Sinatra tribute albums
Oscar Peterson albums
Albums produced by Norman Granz
Verve Records albums